Chiloglottis seminuda, commonly known as the turtle orchid, is a species of orchid endemic to south-eastern New South Wales. It has two broad leaves and a single green or reddish pink flower with a shiny black insect-like callus covering two-thirds of the base of the labellum but with the tip of the labellum free of callus.

Description
The callus is surrounded by pinkish, club-shaped calli and by short black calli nearer the tip. The remaining one-third of the labellum is devoid of calli. Flowering occurs from January to April.

Taxonomy and naming
Chiloglottis seminuda was first formally described in 1991 by David Jones from a specimen collected near Penrose and the description was published in Australian Orchid Research. The specific epithet (seminuda) is derived from the Latin prefix semi- meaning "a half" and nuda meaning "bare" or "naked", referring to the bare one-third of the tip of the labellum.

Distribution and habitat
The turtle orchid grows in moist forest mainly between the Blue Mountains and Clyde Mountain but there are several isolated records from Victoria.

References

External links 

seminuda
Orchids of New South Wales
Orchids of Victoria (Australia)
Plants described in 1991